Huffman Mill Covered Bridge is a historic covered bridge spanning the Anderson River in Anderson Township, Perry County and Harrison Township, Spencer County, Indiana.  It was built in 1864–1865, and is a 148 foot long, Burr arch truss wood, stone, and steel bridge.  It is one-lane wide and is covered by a gabled, steel roof.

It was listed on the National Register of Historic Places in 1998.

References

Covered bridges on the National Register of Historic Places in Indiana
Bridges completed in 1865
Transportation buildings and structures in Perry County, Indiana
National Register of Historic Places in Perry County, Indiana
Transportation buildings and structures in Spencer County, Indiana
National Register of Historic Places in Spencer County, Indiana
Road bridges on the National Register of Historic Places in Indiana
Steel bridges in the United States
Wooden bridges in Indiana
Burr Truss bridges in the United States